Filomena José Trindade, a.k.a. Filó (born September 26, 1971 in Benguela, Angola), is a retired Angolan female handball player. Filó was a member of the Angola women's handball team. At club level, she excelled at Angolan side Petro Atlético, a club with which she won several African club championship titles.

Summer Olympics
Filó competed for Angola at the 1996, 2000, 2004 and 2008 Summer olympics.

Filó is a three-time MVP award winner at the African Women's Handball championship.

Filomena Trindade has currently been serving a term as a member of the parliament for the ruling party, MPLA.

References

External links
 
 

People from Benguela
Angolan female handball players
1971 births
Living people
Olympic handball players of Angola
Handball players at the 1996 Summer Olympics
Handball players at the 2000 Summer Olympics
Handball players at the 2004 Summer Olympics
Handball players at the 2008 Summer Olympics